Guidimouni is a town in southern Niger. It is near the city of Zinder.

Communes of Niger